In the magico-medical tradition of Europe and the Near East, the aetites (singular in Latin) or aetite (anglicized) is a stone used to promote childbirth. It is also called an eagle-stone, aquiline, or aquilaeus. The stone is said to prevent spontaneous abortion and premature delivery, while shortening labor and birth for a full-term birth.

From Theophrastus onwards, the belief is also recorded that the stone had the ability to "give birth" to other stones, based on the crystals found within. This fed into the belief that at least some minerals could be gendered into male and female forms.

Mineralogy
The aetites is a limonite or siderite concretionary nodules or geodes possessing inside a small loose stone rattle when shaken. An official publication of the United States Bureau of Mines in 1920 defined an aetite:

The American Geosciences Institute defines the eaglestone as "a concretionary nodule of clay ironstone about the size of a walnut that the ancients believed an eagle takes to her nest to facilitate egg-laying."

Ancient medicine
According to Pedanius Dioscorides (5.160), the aetite should be fastened to the left arm to protect the fetus; at the time of birth, it should be moved to the hip area to ease delivery.  He also recommends them for the treatment of epilepsy, and says that when mixed with meat they will "betray a thief".

Pliny the Elder describes four types of aetites in his Natural History and outlines their magico-medical use:

Pliny says that the stone is found in the nests of eagles, who cannot propagate without them.

The fourth-century magico-medical text Cyranides also claims that the aetite worn as an amulet can prevent miscarriage caused by female demons such as Gello.

Jewish medical practice
Jewish women used birthing stones, and the Talmud refers to the "preserving stone," worn as an amulet even during Shabbat to prevent miscarriage. Although medieval sources point to the eagle-stone, the identification is not certain. Rabbis in medieval France and Germany, and a Polish talmudist in the 16th century, describe the stone as hollow, with a smaller stone inside: "the stone within a stone represented a fetus in the womb." One medieval French source says that the stone "is pierced through the middle, and is round, about as large and heavy as a medium sized egg, glassy in appearance, and is to be found in the fields."

Medicine to 1700
The aetite, to be carried by pregnant women on their right side, is mentioned by Ruberto Bernardi in his 1364 book of popular medical lore. The Italian Renaissance philosopher Marsilio Ficino ascribes the aetite's ability to ease childbirth to the astrological influences of the planet Venus and the Moon. In 1494, Isabella d'Este, the marchioness of Mantua, expressed her confidence in the power of these stones.

The aetite appears in a Spanish work on natural magic by Hernando Castrillo, first published in 1636. Alvaro Alonso Barba's work on metallurgy (Madrid, 1640) touts the efficacy of the aetites, advising that the stone be tied to the left arm to prevent spontaneous abortion, and to the right arm for the opposite effect. The work was widely reviewed, reprinted and translated.

The 1660 book Occult Physick said the aetite

Aetite, along with hematite, was the subject of a 1665 book by J.L. Bausch, municipal physician of Schweinfurt and founder of the German National Academy of Sciences Leopoldina. Bausch, however, cautions that empty promises of the stone's powers exceed the limits of both medicine and nature. Thomas Browne affirmed the stone's application to obstetrics in his Pseudodoxia Epidemica (1672), but doubted the story about eagles.

The stones were expensive, in Scotland, Anna Balfour included her stone as a bequest in a will, and English women borrowed and shared these stones to use as amulets in pregnancy.

Selected bibliography
Harris, Nichola Erin, The idea of lapidary medicine, 2009, Rutgers University, Ph.D. dissertation (book forthcoming), available online as PDF
Stol, Marten. Birth in Babylonia and the Bible. Styx Publications, 2000. Limited preview online.
Thorndike, Lynn. A History of Magic and Experimental Science.

References

European folklore
Traditional medicine
History of ancient medicine
Mineralogy
Magic (supernatural)